Mechanized Warfare is the sixth studio album released by American power metal band Jag Panzer, released in 2001.  This album is more progressive than the band's previous work. After approximately forty seconds of silence at the end of "All Things Renewed", a recording plays of parts of "The Scarlet Letter", the audio quality sounding like an old phonograph recording with an old time piano in the background.

Track listing

Personnel
Harry Conklin – vocals
Mark Briody – guitar
Chris Broderick – guitar
John Tetley – bass guitar, backing vocals
Rikard Stjernquist – drums

References

2001 albums
Jag Panzer albums
Century Media Records albums
Albums with cover art by Travis Smith (artist)